A Ronda (also known as La Ronda) is one of seven parishes (administrative divisions) in Boal, a municipality within the province and autonomous community of Asturias, in northern Spain. 

A Ronda has an altitude of 585 meters above sea level. It is located about 12.5 kilometers (7.77 miles) from the county seat.

Villages 
 A Baxada
 A Ronda
 Brañadesella
 Brañavara
 El Villar de San Pedro

References 

Parishes in Boal